Arsen Martirosian also transliterated Martirosyan (born 17 April 1977 in Armenia) is an Armenian super bantamweight boxer. He is currently based in France.

In his amateur career he had 82 victories with 53 knockouts, and a total of 101 fights, he later moved to France and turned professional in 2004.

Martirosian is the EBU-EE (European External European Union) super bantamweight title holder.

External links
 
 Rendall Munroe Profile at BritishBoxing.net

1977 births
Living people
Super-bantamweight boxers
Featherweight boxers
Armenian male boxers